The following is a list of chronological attacks attributed to the LTTE in 1970s related to the Sri Lankan Civil War. The deadliest attacks for the decade were in 1979.

Attacks in chronological order

1972

1974
Throughout 1974, the Tamil New Tigers and other Tamil rebel groups launched several bomb attacks targeting the Mayor of Jaffna and Jaffna civilians.

These include:

hands bombs lobbied into a jeep at the Kankesanturai Police Station
dynamite ignited at the home of V. Ponnampalam, a member of the Communist Party
dynamite thrown into Chenkathanai Railway Station causing extensive damage
bombs exploded in the Grand Bazar, Jaffna
CTB buses set on fire

1975

1976
1976, saw a series of brazen robberies committed by the LTTE.

In March 1976, LTTE members robbed the People's Bank at Puttur of Rs. 668,000 in cash and jewellery. This was followed by raids on Multi-Purpose Co-Operative Services in Puloly and Madagal.

1977

1978

In July, 4 robberies are carried out.
2 from CTB buses
1 from a van
Rs. 15,000 from a travelling salesman
In September a CTB bus is set on fire.
Later schoolteacher salaries were robbed in Point Pedro.
On September 7, 1978 a bomb is planted on an Air Ceylon plane flying from Kankesanturai to Colombo. It exploded after landing while in the hangar.
Some time later the Kopai Multi-Purpose Co-Operative Society was robbed of Rs. 30,000 using a stolen vehicle. The owner of the vehicle was thrown into his luggage compartment.

1979

See also
 List of (non-state) terrorist incidents

References

LTTE, 1970s
LTTE, 1970s
LTTE Attacks, 1970s
1970s
Srui
Terrorist incidents in Sri Lanka in the 1970s